This is a list of civil parishes in the ceremonial county of Isle of Wight, England. There are 33 civil parishes.

Isle of Wight
The whole of the county is parished.

 Data Source: Office of National Statistics: QS102EW - Population density

Notes
 Formerly Cowes Urban District
 Formerly Isle of Wight Rural District
 Formerly Newport Municipal Borough, also formerly Newport Parish Council.
 Formerly Ryde Municipal Borough
 Formerly Sandown-Shanklin Urban District
 Formerly Ventnor Urban District

See also
 List of civil parishes in England

References

External links
 Office for National Statistics : Geographical Area Listings
 Isle of Wight Council : Parish and Town Councils
 Isle of Wight - Medieval Parishes (map)

Civil parishes
Isle of Wight
 
Civil parishes
Civil parishes